Holt Public Schools is a school district headquartered in Holt, Michigan.

Schools
Secondary:
Holt High School
Holt Junior High School

Middle schools:
Hope Middle School
Washington Woods Middle School

Elementary schools:
 Dimondale Elementary School - Dimondale
 Elliott Elementary School
 Horizon Elementary School
 Sycamore Elementary School
 Wilcox Elementary School

Preschool:
 Midway Early Learning Center

References

External links
 Holt Public Schools

School districts in Michigan
Education in Ingham County, Michigan